Sissa is a town in the Italian region of Emilia-Romagna. Administratively, it is a frazione of the comune of Sissa Trecasali in the Province of Parma. It was an independent comune until it was merged in 2014 with Trecasali to form Sissa Trecasali.

Sissa borders the following municipalities: Colorno, Gussola, Martignana di Po, Roccabianca, San Secondo Parmense, Torricella del Pizzo, Torrile, Trecasali. The town is home to a Pork carnival in November, known as the Sapori del Maiale.

Main sights 

Rocca dei Terzi

References

Former municipalities of Emilia-Romagna
Frazioni of the Province of Parma
Cities and towns in Emilia-Romagna
Castles in Italy